Geestenseth is a railway station in northwestern Germany. It is owned and operated by EVB, with regular trains on the line between Bremerhaven and Buxtehude.

References

Railway stations in Lower Saxony
Eisenbahnen und Verkehrsbetriebe Elbe-Weser
Railway stations in Germany opened in 1898